The 23rd Marine Regiment (23rd Marines) is a reserve infantry regiment of the United States Marine Corps.  It is headquartered in San Bruno, California and falls under the command of the 4th Marine Division and the Marine Forces Reserve.

The regiment comprises twenty units which are geographically dispersed throughout eight states from California to Alabama.  The regiment consists of Marine reservists, active duty Marines and active duty Navy personnel.  The regimental headquarters is located in San Bruno, California.

Mission
To provide administratively and medically ready Marines and Sailors; and trains ground combat formations to augment and reinforce the active component in order to support Combatant Commands and service level requirementslocate.

Subordinate units
Headquarters Company 23rd Marines (HQ/23rd Marines) - San Bruno, California
1st Battalion, 23rd Marines (1/23rd Marines) - Ellington Field, Texas
2nd Battalion, 23rd Marines (2/23rd Marines) - Pasadena, California
3rd Battalion, 23rd Marines (3/23rd Marines) - Bridgeton, Missouri
2nd Battalion, 24th Marines (2/24th Marines) - Fort Sheridan, Illinois
Truck Company 23rd Marines - Nellis Air Force Base, Nevada

History

World War II
The 23rd Marine Regiment was activated on 20 July 1942 at New River, North Carolina; was assigned to the 4th Marine Division in February 1943 and relocated during July 1943 to Camp Pendleton, California. Regiment's first commanding officer was Colonel Louis R. Jones.

During World War II, the 23rd Marines participated in the following campaigns: Kwajalein, Saipan, Tinian, and the Battle of Iwo Jima. During the fierce fighting which occurred in the Pacific Theater, four Marines of the 23rd Marine Regiment were awarded the Medal of Honor for valor:
 Richard B. Anderson, 2/23, Kwajalein
 Joseph W. Ozbourn, 1/23, Tinian
 Darrell S. Cole, 1/23, Iwo Jima
 Douglas T. Jacobson, 3/23, Iwo Jima

Starting at Kwajalein, the 23rd Marines was assigned to land on beaches red 2 & 3 at Roi. That island was taken in a day.   Saipan came next with the 23d Marines assigned to blue beaches 1 & 2 with third Battalion 20th Marines as their Shore Party (121st Seabees).  Across the strait at Tinian the 23rd Marines was the assault reserve landing on beach white 2.  The 121st CB was still assigned to them.
For the assault on Iwo Jima the 23rd Marines was assigned to yellow beaches with 1/23 the left assault Battalion on yellow beach 1.  The right assault Battalion 2/23 was on yellow beach 2 and 3/23 was the assault reserve.  The 23rd Marines did not have a Pioneer Battalion for the assault Shore Party so the Seabees of Naval Mobile Construction Battalion 133 were task assigned that duty until relieved D-plus 18.
The 23d Marines made four assaults during WWII with Seabees as their beach support each time.

In October 1945, the regiment was again relocated to Camp Pendleton and was subsequently inactivated on 15 November 1945.

Regimental Commanders
Lieutenant Colonel William B. Onley (20 July 1942 - 2 September 1942)
Colonel Louis R. Jones (3 September 1942 - 15 October 1944)
Colonel Walter W. Wensinger (16 October 1944 - 9 April 1945)
Lieutenant Colonel Edward J. Dillon (10 April 1945 - 2 May 1945)
Colonel Leonard B. Cresswell (3 May 1945 - 15 November 1945)

1950s to the 1990s
The 23rd Marine Regiment was reactivated on 1 February 1966 in Alameda, California and assigned during the same month to the 4th Marine Division, USMCR.

3d Battalion, 23rd Marines was activated in Nov 1990 and deployed to Saudi Arabia for Desert Shield.  3/23 was attached to the 8th Marine Regiment of the 2nd Marine Division and deployed along the Kuwaiti/Saudi Arabian border conducting patrolling and security operations.  Two days before G-Day, 3/23 attacked into Kuwait at Umm Gudair to secure forward artillery positions for the support of the attack into Kuwait.  With this action, 3/23 became the first unit of the 2nd Marine Division to enter combat since World War II.  3/23 continued to advance as part of 8th Marines, fighting actions into Kuwait City when the ceasefire was called.

In December 1990, the 2nd Battalion, 1st Battalion, and Headquarters Co. were activated in January 1991 as part of the 23d Marines which were mobilized by Presidential call-up to support Operation Desert Shield and Operation Desert Storm. 2d Battalion, 23rd Marines responded to the eruption of Mt. Pinatubo in the Philippine islands in 1991 and provided critical humanitarian relief.

Global War on Terror
The 23rd Marine Regiment, either in whole or in part, have been activated multiple times including 2003, 2006, and 2009.
In June, 2012, the 23rd Marine Regimental Headquarters Company deployed to Barbados, Caribbean for Tradewinds 2012.

Unit Awards
  Presidential Unit Citation with one bronze star
  Navy Unit Commendation
  American Campaign Medal with 4 bronze stars
  Asiatic-Pacific Campaign Medal with 4 Arrowheads (World War II)
  World War II Victory Medal
  Navy Meritorious Unit Commendation 1990-91

See also

 Marine Forces Reserve
 List of United States Marine Corps regiments
 Organization of the United States Marine Corps
 Naval Mobile Construction Battalion 133
 USS Logan ** USS Newberry ** USS Mifflin ** USS Lowndes

References

This article incorporates text in the public domain from the United States Marine Corps.

External links
 23d Marines Official Website
 23d Marines Toys for Tots Website

4th Marine Division (United States)
Military units and formations established in 1942
Infantry23
Infantry units and formations of the United States Marine Corps
San Bruno, California
1942 establishments in the United States